Washington Iza, (born 1947) is an Ecuadorian artist known chiefly for his radical surrealistic style of painting that contrasted sharply with more traditional styles used by fellow Ecuadorian painters such as Oswaldo Guayasamín, Eduardo Kingman and Bolivar Mena Franco.

References

1947 births
Living people
Ecuadorian artists
Date of birth missing (living people)
Place of birth missing (living people)